Crataegus holmesiana is a species of hawthorn closely related to Scarlet Hawthorn,  C. coccinea  (often incorrectly called C. pedicellata), but with more elongated fruit and leaves.

References

External links
USDA Plants Profile for C. coccinea/C. pedicellata

holmesiana
Flora of North America